Apex Motors is a Hong Kong and British-based car company founded by Hong Kong/Australian brothers Jason and Gary Leung in 2018 and evolved from the Elemental RP-1.

The company launched in 2019 with a limited production AP-1 open road and track sports car in Hong Kong, powered by a Ford 2.3-litre 400 bhp engine.

In March 2020 in unveiled the Apex AP-0 electric sports car concept, to be built in England from 2022.

Models

 Apex AP-1 limited production sports car
 Apex AP-0 all-electric concept sports car

References

External links
 

Automotive companies of China
Automotive companies of the United Kingdom
Battery electric vehicle manufacturers
Electric vehicle manufacturers
Luxury motor vehicle manufacturers